Inghirami is a surname. Notable people with the surname include:

 Jacopo Inghirami (1565–1624), admiral of the Grand Duchy of Tuscany and marquis of Montevitozzo
 Giovanni Inghirami (1779–1851), Italian astronomer, Catholic priest and Piarist
 Tommaso Inghirami (1470–1516) (also known as Phaedra, Phaedrus, or Fedra), Italian renaissance humanist and deacon of the Catholic Church

See also
 Inghirami (crater), lunar impact crater